Bavarian (Bavarian: Boarisch) or alternately Austro-Bavarian, is a West Germanic language consisting in a group of dialects, part of the Upper German family, together with Alemannic and East Franconian.

It can be found in the German state of Bavaria (especially Old Bavaria), most of the Republic of Austria (excluding Vorarlberg) and the Italian region of South Tyrol. In 2008, 45 percent of Bavarians claimed to use only dialect in everyday communication. Prior to 1945, Bavarian was also prevalent in parts of the southern Czech Republic and western Hungary.

Language or dialect 

Bavarian is commonly considered to be a dialect of German, but some sources classify it as a separate language: the International Organization for Standardization has assigned a unique ISO 639-3 language code (bar), and the UNESCO lists Bavarian in the Atlas of the World's Languages in Danger since 2009; anyway, the classification of Bavarian as an individual language has been criticized by some scholars of Bavarian.

The reason why Bavarian can be viewed as a separate language is its relative distance from Standard German: the difference between Bavarian and Standard German is larger than the difference between Danish and Norwegian or between Czech and Slovak.

Reasons why Bavarian can be viewed as a dialect of German include the perception of its speakers, the lack of standardization, the traditional use of Standard German as a roofing language, the relative closeness to German which does not justify Bavarian to be viewed as an abstand language, or the fact that no country applied for Bavarian to be entered into the European Charter for Regional or Minority Languages.

Origins

History and Etymology 

The word Bavarian is derived from the name of the people who settled Bavaria along with their tribal dialect.  The origin of the word is disputed.  The most common theory traces the word to Bajowarjōz, meaning "inhabitants of Bojer land".  In turn, Bojer originated as the name for former Celtic inhabitants of the area, with the name passing to the mixed population of Celts, Romans, and successive waves of German arrivals during the early medieval period.    

The local population eventually established the Duchy of Bavaria, forming the south-eastern part of the kingdom of Germany.

The dialectal separation of Upper German into East Upper German (Bavarian) and West Upper German (Alemannic) became more tangible in the Middle High German period, from about the 12th century.

Geographical distribution and dialects
 In Europe:
 In Germany, the language is spoken in Upper Bavaria, Lower Bavaria, and the Upper Palatinate districts in Bavaria. It is also spoken in southern Vogtland, in Saxony;
 In Austria, except Vorarlberg and Reutte;
 In Italy in South Tyrol and a handful of linguistic enclaves of Cimbrian and Carnic people in Northern Italy;
 In Switzerland, it is spoken in the village of Samnaun, in Grisons;
 In Sopron (Hungary) and surroundings.
 Outside of Europe:
 In Treze Tílias, Brazil
 In Pozuzo, Peru
 In the United States and Canada

Three main dialects of Bavarian are:
 Northern Bavarian, mainly spoken in Upper Palatinate, but also in adjacent areas (small parts of Upper Franconia (Wunsiedel (district) and Bayreuth (district)), Saxony (southern Vogtland), Middle Franconia, Upper Bavaria and Lower Bavaria).
 Central Bavarian along the main rivers Isar and Danube, spoken in Upper Bavaria (including Munich, which has a standard German-speaking majority), Lower Bavaria, southern Upper Palatinate, the Swabian district of Aichach-Friedberg, the northern parts of the State of Salzburg, Upper Austria, Lower Austria, Vienna (see Viennese German) and the Northern Burgenland.
 Southern Bavarian in Samnaun, Tyrol, South Tyrol, Carinthia, Styria, and the southern parts of Salzburg and Burgenland.

Differences are clearly noticeable within those three subgroups, which in Austria often coincide with the borders of the particular states. For example, each of the accents of Carinthia, Styria, and Tyrol can be easily recognised. Also, there is a marked difference between eastern and western central Bavarian, roughly coinciding with the border between Austria and Bavaria. In addition, the Viennese dialect has some characteristics distinguishing it from all other dialects. In Vienna, minor, but recognizable, variations are characteristic for distinct districts of the city.

Before the expulsion of Germans from Czechoslovakia, the linguistic border of Bavarian with Czech was on the farther side of the Bohemian Forest and its Bohemian foreland was Bavarian-speaking.

Use

 Given that Central German and Upper German together comprise the High German languages, out of which the then new, written standard was developed and as opposed to Low German, that is an alternative naming many High German dialect speakers regard justified.

School

Literature

Web
There is a Bavarian Wikipedia. Also, the official FC Bayern Munich website was available in Bavarian.

Phonology

Consonants

Notes:

Aspiration may occur among voiceless plosives in word-initial position.
A trill sound  may also be realised as a flap [].
Intervocalic  can be realised as [] or [, ].
Some dialects, such as the Bavarian dialect in South Tyrol, realise  as an affricate  word-initially and before , which is an extension of the High German consonant shift to velar consonants.

Vowels
Vowel phonemes in parentheses occur only in certain Bavarian dialects or only appear as allophones or in diphthongs. Nasalization may also be distinguished in some dialects.

Bavarian has an extensive vowel inventory, like most Germanic languages. Vowels can be grouped as back rounded, front unrounded and front rounded. They are also traditionally distinguished by length or tenseness.

Grammar 

 Bavarian usually has case inflection only for the article. With very few exceptions, nouns are not inflected for case.
 The simple past tense is very rare in Bavarian and has been retained for only a few verbs, including 'to be' and 'to want'. In general, the perfect is used to express past time.
 Bavarian features verbal inflection for several moods such as indicative, subjunctive, imperative and optative . See the table below for inflection of the Bavarian verb måcha, 'make; do':

Pronouns

Personal pronouns

* These are typically used in the very northern dialects of Bavarian.

Possessive pronouns

The possessive pronouns Deina and Seina inflect in the same manner. Oftentimes, nige is added to the nominative to form the adjective form of the possessive pronoun, like mei(nige), dei(nige), and the like.

Indefinite pronouns

Just like the possessive pronouns listed above, the indefinite pronouns koana, "none", and oana, "one" are inflected the same way.

There is also the indefinite pronoun ebba(d), "someone" with its impersonal form ebb(a)s, "something". It is inflected in the following way:

Interrogative pronouns
The interrogative pronouns wea, "who", and wås, "what" are inflected the same way the indefinite pronoun ebba is inflected.

Society 

Bavarians produce a variety of nicknames for those who bear traditional Bavarian or German names like Josef, Theresa or Georg (becoming Sepp'l or more commonly Sepp, Resi and Schorsch, respectively). Bavarians often refer to names with the family name coming first (like da Stoiber Ede instead of Edmund Stoiber). The use of the article is considered mandatory when using this linguistic variation. In addition, nicknames different from the family name exist for almost all families, especially in small villages. They consist largely of their profession, names or professions of deceased inhabitants of their homes or the site where their homes are located. This nickname is called Hausname (en: name of the house) and is seldom used to name the person, but more to state where they come from or live or to whom they are related. Examples of this are:
 Mohler (e.g. Maler – painter)
 Bachbauer (farmer who lives near a brook/creek)
 Moosrees (Theresa (Rees/Resi) who lives near a moss)
 Schreiner (joiner/carpenter)

Samples of Bavarian dialects 

The dialects can be seen to share a number of features with Yiddish.

See also 
 Austrian German
 Viennese German

References

Further reading
Dictionary
 Schmeller, Johann Andreas; edited by Frommann, Georg Karl (1872 & 1877). Bayerisches Wörterbuch. 2nd ed. in 2 vol., Rudolf Oldenbourg, München
 
Philology
 
 
 Kühebacher, Egon (1965–1971). Tirolischer Sprachatlas. 3 Vol.: Vokalismus, Konsonantismus, Sprachatlas. (= Deutscher Sprachatlas. Regionale Sprachatlanten. Hg. von Ludwig Erich Schmitt, Karl Kurt Klein, Reiner Hildebrandt, Kurt Rein. Bde. 3/1–3). Marburg: N. G. Elwert Verlag.

External links 

 Bavarian Wikipedia: Wikipedia:Boarische Umschrift, Boarische Dialekte im Vagleich

 
German dialects
Languages of Germany
Languages of Trentino-Alto Adige/Südtirol
Baiuvarii
Altbayern